Fateme Asadi (1960–1984) was an Iranian woman who was tortured and killed by the Democratic Party of Iranian Kurdistan (PDKI) when she was attempting to obtain the release of her husband, who was detained by the group. Her remains, found 37 years later in 2021, were buried in the Chehel Cheshmeh mountains in Divandarreh district and identified by a DNA test. She was labelled a martyr by Iranian media.

Early life and death 
Fateme Asadi was born in 1960 in Bagherabad, a village in Divandarreh, Kurdistan Province, Iran. Asadi's husband dug wells for the village of Hosseinabad in Sanandaj at the request of the Islamic Revolutionary Guard Corps (IRGC). The Democratic Party of Iranian Kurdistan (KDPI) accused him of being an IRGC spy. He was held on this pretext and transported by the militia to the Dowlatou prison. The militants asked for 200,000 tomans, which Fateme Asadi collected by selling her belongings. The KDPI militants detained her while she was handing over the money, and they harassed and tortured her for a month before shooting her to death.

Fateme Asadi's remains were found on 7 November 2021 during explorations in the Chehel Cheshmeh mountains in Divandarreh. DNA analysis was used to determine her identity, the first such use to identify victims of terror in Iran.

Funeral 

Asadi's funeral was held at the Imam Reza shrine on 11 November 2021 and at the Fatima Masumeh Shrine the next day. Another funeral was held for her on 16 November 2021, with mourners processing from Azadi Square in Sanandaj to her resting place in Hajar Khatoon Mosque.

Legacy 
The Fateme Asadi Award celebrates rural women artists in the fields of performing arts, cinema, visual arts, decorative arts, hand-woven carpets, clothes and music. Rural women writers who have authored or translated books, stories and poetry can also apply for this award. Rural women who are media activists, leaders of rural non-governmental organizations, experts in rural management, sportswomen, or preachers and promoters of Quranic culture are among the other potential recipients of the award.

References 

Iran–Iraq War
2021 in Iran
1960 births
1984 deaths
Incidents of violence against women
20th-century Iranian women
1984 in Iran
People from Kurdistan Province
Violence against women in Iran